Hofreiter is a German surname. It may refer to:
 Anton Hofreiter (born 1970), German biologist and politician (Alliance 90/The Greens)
 Karl Hofreiter (18th century), German painter
 Nikolaus Hofreiter (1904–1990), Austrian mathematician 
 Siegfried Hofreiter (born 1962), German businessman